Joseph Dudley Lawrence (born February 13, 1977) is an American former professional baseball player.

Biography

Early life
Joe Lawrence was born Joseph Dudley Lawrence in Lake Charles, Louisiana on February 13, 1977.

Baseball career
Lawrence played for only one team during his short tenure of 55 games in Major League Baseball in 2002, the Toronto Blue Jays.

External links

1977 births
Living people
American expatriate baseball players in Canada
Baseball players from Louisiana
Dunedin Blue Jays players
Hagerstown Suns players
Indianapolis Indians players
Knoxville Smokies players
Major League Baseball second basemen
St. Catharines Stompers players
Syracuse SkyChiefs players
Tennessee Smokies players
Toronto Blue Jays players